The 1984 Open Championship was a men's major golf championship and the 113th Open Championship, held from 19 to 22 July at the Old Course in St Andrews, Scotland. Seve Ballesteros won his second Open Championship and fourth major title, two strokes ahead of runners-up Bernhard Langer and five-time champion Tom Watson, the defending champion.

In the final round, Ballesteros birdied the 18th hole for 69 while 54-hole co-leader Watson bogeyed the famous 17th (Road) for a 73, which ended his bid for a third consecutive Open.

Ballesteros' famous fist pump after his last putt is one of the enduring images of golf. It was further commemorated during the 2012 Ryder Cup at Medinah, also known as the "Miracle at Medinah" after Europe's famous comeback. It was also the first Ryder Cup after Ballesteros' death due to brain cancer in May 2011 at the age of 54, and in his memory, Team Europe's kit bore the silhouette of Ballesteros' celebration. The team also wore navy blue and white garments – his traditional Sunday colors – for the Sunday singles.

Course

Previous lengths of the course for The Open Championship (since 1950):
  - 1978
  - 1970
  - 1964
  - 1960, 1955

Past champions in the field

Made both cuts

Source:

Missed the second cut

Source:

Missed the first cut

Source:

Round summaries

First round
Thursday, 19 July 1984

Source:

Second round
Friday, 20 July 1984

Amateurs: Sherborne (+2), McEvoy (+4), Olazábal (+5), Sigel (+5), Wood (+8), Hawksworth (+12).

Third round
Saturday, 21 July 1984

Source:

Amateurs: Sherborne (+5), McEvoy (WD)

Final round
Sunday, 22 July 1984

Source:

References

External links
St Andrews 1984 (Official site)
113th Open Championship - St Andrews (European Tour)

The Open Championship
Golf tournaments in Scotland
Open Championship
Open Championship
Open Championship